Cantao may refer to:
 Cantão, a Brazilian forest ecosystem
 Cantao (genus), a genus of bugs in the family Scutelleridae
 Cantão State Park, a state park in Tocantins, Brazil